National Dance Day was launched in 2010 by Nigel Lythgoe, the co-creator of So You Think You Can Dance and co-founder of American Dance Movement (formerly the Dizzy Feet Foundation) in partnership with American congresswoman Eleanor Holmes Norton who introduced a National Dance Day resolution to express support for dance as a form of valuable exercise and of artistic expression. As of 2019, National Dance Day is celebrated in the United States annually on the third Saturday in September; the next celebration is September 18, 2021. Prior to 2019 celebrations were held on the last Saturday in July.

References

External links

Dance events
Awareness days
Holidays and observances by scheduling (nth weekday of the month)
September observances